The Hoorn–Medemblik heritage railway operated by the Museumstoomtram Hoorn Medemblik is a heritage railway in the Netherlands.

History 

The original railway line was operated by Locaalspoorwegmaatschappij Hollands Noorderkwartier (1884 - 1935). The line was opened on 3 November 1887. The track followed a circuitous route to reduce the amount of land that had to be compulsorily purchased. The line used steam traction; diesel traction being introduced in 1929.

The line was closed to passenger services from 1 January 1936 to 29 May 1940.

On 5 January 1941 the line was permanently closed to passenger services; as was the railway station in Medemblik.

Heritage railway 
Today, the railway is operated as a tourist attraction. The centrepiece of its collection is the former Nederlandse Spoorwegen locomotive 7742 Bello, the only preserved light steam engine in the Netherlands. Other steam locomotives in running order include three tramway engines, two of which are enclosed tram engines (steam dummies).
The remaining ones are: three industrial engines; a German engine which is rebuilt as a replica of a Dutch railway shunting engine (of a series of which several also served on steam tramways); and a locomotive of industrial type which served at a steam tram company in Zuid-Holland, still awaiting restoration.

Seven of the ten steam locomotives are official Dutch railway monuments.

NS 7742 and the two enclosed tram engines are in regular use: Bello mainly in the peak season afternoon train. The regular 10.40 am train is pulled by tramloco LTM 26. The two steam dummies mainly in the peak season (Tue/Wed/Thu).

Eight steam tram carriages are in regular service, as well as several steam tram goods wagons.

Bello and the three tramway engines originate from the provinces North Holland, South Holland and Limburg.
The serviceable steam tram carriages originate from the provinces Friesland, Gelderland, North Holland, South Holland and Zeeland.

The livery and presentation of the cars is as they were in 1926.

The station is twinned with the Bluebell Railway in England. The ride between Hoorn and Medemblik is often combined by tourists with a trip from Medemblik to Enkhuizen by boat.

On the disused side of platform 2 of Huddersfield railway station in northern England, an old carriage is bolted to the ground, and set in its window is a Dutch plaque commemorating 100 years of Stoomtram Hoorn - Medemblik.

Film
The railway was used as film location for the 1979 movie The Riddle of the Sands: the station building of 'Emden' was in fact Medemblik, and Twisk was used to represent 'Bensersiel'.

Route 

Stations in italics have been restored.

Gallery

See also
List of heritage railways
 NS_7700

References

External links
The most exciting journey through time by Steamtram and Boat! (English)
Stationsweb entry (Dutch)

Heritage railways in the Netherlands
Hoorn
Tourist attractions in North Holland